"Marry Me" is a song by American recording artist Jason Derulo, released as the second single in the US and Canadian markets (third overall) from his third studio album, Tattoos (2013) (US version titled Talk Dirty). The song was written by Jason Derulo, Jonas Jeberg, "Hookman" Marlin Bonds, Andy Marvel while the song's production was handled by Jonas Jeberg. It is the third track on Tattoos and the eleventh and final track on Talk Dirty.

Background and release
During an interview with On Air with Ryan Seacrest, Derulo revealed that he wrote the song as an ode to his then girlfriend, former American Idol winner, singer Jordin Sparks. He also shared his favorite lyric: " '.... 105 is the number that comes to my head when I think of all the years I want to be with you.' It’s one of those things you want to wake up next to that person forever so 105 is the number that I thought of".

Music video
The music video to "Marry Me" was released on Derulo's YouTube account on September 23, 2013. The video also features Jordin Sparks who appears on the video since Derulo dedicated to her. The music video also premiered on BET's 106 & Park the same day. In the video, Derulo can be seen buying a ring, waking up with Sparks, Derulo playing the piano while Sparks lies on top. Then, other scenes include the two of them relaxing in a bathtub, watching a movie, eating and fighting with flour. The older version of Derulo and Sparks at the end were played by Derulo's real-life grandparents.

Critical reception
Entertainment Weekly compared the song to Bruno Mars' "Just the Way You Are", saying that "it touches the same romance level of that song", but in a "cornier" way. Karen Lanza of Popcrush said Derulo "has granted the world its next top wedding tune" and called it an "upbeat love song"

Release and artwork
The artwork for the single features the diamond ring seen in Derulo's computerized neck tattoo on the album cover of Tattoos. The song made its world premiere of the new song on On Air with Ryan Seacrest on Monday August 26, 2013, and was made available for digital download through digital retailers on the day.

Usage in media
The song was featured in the 2014 re-release of the game Grand Theft Auto V on the fictional radio station "Radio Los Santos", despite the station not playing R&B, it was also featured in Comedy Central animated series South Park episode "Basic Cable".

Track listing
 Digital download
 "Marry Me" – 3:45

Charts

Weekly charts

Year-end charts

Certifications

Credits and personnel
 Vocals – Jason Derulo
 Lyrics – Jason Desrouleaux, Jonas Jeberg, "Hookman" Marlin Bonds, Andy Marvel
 Producer – Jonas Jeberg
 Label – Warner Bros. Records Inc.

Release history

References

2013 songs
2013 singles
2010s ballads
Contemporary R&B ballads
Jason Derulo songs
Pop ballads
Songs about marriage
Music videos directed by Hannah Lux Davis